Fluoroiodomethane is the halomethane with the formula FCH2I.  Also classified as a fluoroiodocarbon (FIC), it is a colorless liquid.  It is a reagent for the introduction of the fluoromethyl (FCH2) group.

Synthesis and uses
It is prepared by fluorination of methylene iodide.

Its isotopomer [18F]fluoroiodomethane is used for fluoromethylation of radiopharmaceuticals.

Additional reading

References

Halomethanes
Organofluorides
Organoiodides